Bharat Vatwani is an Indian psychiatrist, based in Mumbai, India, who was awarded Ramon Magsaysay Award in 2018 for leading the rescue of thousands of mentally ill street paupers to treat and reunite them with their families in India.

Dr Vatwani had come across a road side destitute in 1988. He felt bad about him. Dr admitted destitute to his clinic. Then he started to treat roadside destitutes free of charge and reuniting him. He did this work relentlessly till 2005 in his Boriwali clinic.

In 2006 Dr Vatwani shifted his rehabilitation centre to Vengaon near Karjat which was inaugurated by Hon. Prakash Amte. Dr Vatwani has reunited 5500 plus people to their home and has treated total 7000 plus people for psychiatric illness. 

His work came into lime light when he was awarded Ramon Magasesey award in 2018.

References

Living people
Year of birth missing (living people)
Place of birth missing (living people)
Social workers
Ramon Magsaysay Award winners